The All-Ireland Junior Camogie Championship is a competition for third-tier county teams in the women's field sport of camogie and for second-string teams of first-tier counties. In accordance with the practice in GAA competitions the term junior applies to the level of competition rather than the age group.

The 2021 championship was contested by Armagh, Cavan, Roscommon and the second teams of Antrim, Clare, Down, Limerick, Kildare, Waterford and Wexford.

History
The competition was established in 1969 for the New Ireland Cup. The name was changed to the Kay Mills Cup in honour of former player Kathleen Mills in 2010.

In 2006 the second teams of the first-tier camogie counties were removed from the competition. Since 2010 the competition has been officially, though not popularly, known as the Premier Junior Ireland championship. It is the third-tier camogie competition after the O'Duffy Cup for the Senior Championship and the Jack McGrath Cup for the Intermediate Championship. The series of games, organised by the Camogie Association, are played during the summer months with the finals of the three competitions taking place on the second Sunday in September in Croke Park, Dublin.

Kay Mills Cup Camogie Finals
The first figure is the number of goals scored (equal to 3 points each) and the second total is the number of points scored, the figures are combined to determine the winner of a match in Gaelic Games

Wins listed by county

Highlights
 Down's victory in the inaugural junior championship in 1968. The team was N McKenna, P McGrady, R McCann, E Coulter, N Sands, R Walsh, M Caldwell, B Sands, C Reid, P Crangle, AM Kelly, and E Turley.
 Wexford‘s victory in the 1968 Leinster Junior championship and Smyco Cup before losing to Down in the All Ireland semi-final - the Smyco Cup in Leinster preceded the provincial and Leinster junior championships,
 Derry's victory in the 1969 championship with two goals from J McTeake and further goals from M McTeake and E McGuirk.
 Roscommon's breakthrough in 1970, beating Mayo in the Connacht final and then hosting the All Ireland semi-final against Dublin at Athleague.
 Cork's 1973 victory after losing three finals in the previous three years, Midge Poniard scoring a point that rebounded from a thirty she had taken herself.
 Clare's breakthrough victory in 1974, coming from behind in the final minutes, on a day the referee blew the final whistle five minutes short, the goals from M Davern, M Dolan and M Griffin.
 Down's one point win in 1976, thanks to a great performance and a controversial point by Marion McGarvey, sent over the top crossbar but allowed by the referee.
 Limerick's breakthrough win in 1977, on a day Eileen Kehoe scored all of Wexford's 3-1
 Derry's win in 1978 with two goals from dual player, hockey international Caroline McWilliams and another from Kathleen Marrion from Greenlough.
 Louth's breakthrough victory in 1982, with the winning score from Noreen Maguire, a goal from Mary O’Connor, Ann Currid and Kitty Sharkey.
 Deirdre Costelloe's four goals for Galway in the 1985 final
 Catherine O'Loughlin's emergence as key player for Clare in the 1986 final.
 Kildare's breakthrough victory in 1987, Miriam Malone scoring 1-6 and a second goal coming from Marianne Johnson.
 Galway's 1988 victory with dominant performances from Imelda Hobbins, who scored 2-3, and Ann Coleman who score 1-3
 Kildare's 1990 victory, holding of a great Tipperary rally, key players were Maria Malone who scored 1-5 before Tipperary replied, and Melanie Treacy at full-back.
 Limerick's victory in 1995 with three goals from the diminutive Kay Burke, preventing a breakthrough victory by Roscommon by one point.
 Cork's 1996 win over Roscommon with three goals by Mary Kennefick.
 Galway's 1998 victory over Tipperary by four points, with Lourda Kavanagh scoring 1-9.
 Cork's one point win over Derry in a 1999 thriller, Shauna McCaul having hit the woodwork for Derry and goalkeeper Geraldine Casey saved twice from Cork full forward Mary O’Kane.
 Derry's victory in 2000 with eleven points from Paula McAtamney and the performance of goalkeeper Aileen Crilly who denied Amanda O'Regan several goal chances.
 The 2002 final in which Kilkenny's Aoife Neary burst on the scene with 1-8
 Catherine O'Loughlin's stunning last-second goal in 2003 to earn a draw for Clare, who had trailed by four points going into injury time.
 Niamh Taylor's injury time pressure-point from a free in 2006 to earn a draw for Dublin.
 Aisling Diamond's goal after seven and a half minutes of injury time to give Derry a one-point victory over Offaly in 2007, after the sides were level seven times.

Nancy Murray Cup
The Junior A championship was introduced under new competition structures in 2006. The grade, the fourth tier for inter-county teams, was contested by Donegal, Louth, Mayo, Monaghan, Tyrone and Wicklow in 2021.

The trophy is named after Nancy Murray who was President of the Camogie Association from 1973 to 1975. A member of the Deirdre club in Belfast, Murray won three All-Ireland senior medals with Antrim, coached her county to All-Ireland success in 1956 and 1967 and refereed four All-Ireland senior finals. 

 2006 Armagh 0-07 Laois 0-01
 2007 Laois 1-15 Meath 1-09
 2008 Meath 0-10 Roscommon 1-06
 2009 Roscommon 2-08 Armagh 3-05
 Replay Roscommon 1-07 Armagh 0-07
 2010 Kildare 3-10 Armagh 2-08
 2011 Armagh 1-07 Westmeath 1-07 
 Replay Armagh 3-13 Westmeath 3-05 
 2012 Westmeath 1-14 Dublin 2-06
 2013 Dublin 1-13 Offaly 0-08
 2014 Limerick 2-08 Carlow 1-06
 2015 Carlow 0-14 Kerry 0-03
 2020 Cavan 2-14 Tyrone 1-03
 2021 Mayo 3-08 Tyrone 1-12
 2022 Tyrone 3-10 Wicklow 3-09

Máire Ní Chinnéide Cup
The Junior B championship was introduced under new competition structures in 2006 for the fifth tier of inter-county teams. The trophy is named for Máire Ní Chinnéide, first president of the Camogie Association and one of the founders of the game in the Craobh a’ Chéitinnigh branch of Conradh na Gaeilge.

 2006 Westmeath 3-05 Monaghan 1-04
 2007 Carlow 0-10 Monaghan 1-03
 2008 Tyrone 4-11 Wicklow 1-03
 2009 Cavan 0-05 Wicklow 0-04
 2010 Monaghan 1-07 Cavan 1-07
 Replay Monaghan 0-12 Cavan 1-08
 2011 Monaghan 1-12 Wicklow 1-07
 2012 Carlow 1-11 Kerry 1-03
 2013 Meath 2-04 Kerry 1-05

See also
 All-Ireland Senior Camogie Championship
 Wikipedia List of Camogie players
 National Camogie League
 Camogie All Stars Awards
 Ashbourne Cup

References

External links
Camogie website

3